Byron Price (March 25, 1891August 6, 1981) was director of the U.S. Office of Censorship during World War II.

Life
Price was born near Topeka, Indiana, on 25 March 1891. He was a magazine editor at Topeka High School, and worked as a journalist and newspaper deliverer at the Crawfordsville Journal and the college newspaper while attending Wabash College. 

He joined United Press in 1912 and the Associated Press (AP) soon after, where he stayed for 29 years except for two years in the United States Army during World War I. Price served as the AP's Washington bureau chief and, in 1937, became executive news editor of the organization. Price became the U.S. Director of Censorship on December 19, 1941. This was a day after the First War Powers Act was established. Heading the Office of Censorship allowed Price to censor international communication, issue censorship rules, and set up two advisory panels to assist him in his duties. For his "creation and administration of the newspaper and radio codes" at the Office of Censorship, Price received a special Pulitzer Prize in 1944. 
In 1946, President Harry S. Truman presented him with the Medal for Merit for "exceptionally meritorious conduct in the performance of outstanding services as Director, Office of Censorship, from December 20, 1941, until August 15, 1945."

After the Office closed in November 1945, Price did not return to the AP. Instead he became a vice-president of the Motion Picture Association of America, then an Assistant Secretary General at the United Nations until retiring in 1954. 
During the Cuban Missile Crisis in 1962, Price agreed to resume direction of censorship if war broke out with the Soviet Union. The Byron Price papers are located at the Wisconsin Historical Society in Madison, WI.

Notes

References

External links

Medal of Merit Citation
 
 

1891 births
1981 deaths
American people of World War II
Associated Press reporters
Price, Bryon
Pulitzer Prize winners for journalism
Wabash College alumni
Franklin D. Roosevelt administration personnel
Truman administration personnel
American officials of the United Nations